The DAC 6135 was a Romanian truck that was produced from 1975 to 1992 by Diesel Auto Camion (DAC) in Brașov. It proved popular in Romania and was also exported. It was available as the 6135R base model with three different wheelbases, a tipper and a tractor, as well as the four-wheel drive 6135RA and 6135RAN. The truck was to be succeeded by the more advanced 8135 in 1985, but stayed in limited production alongside it for several years.

Design and development
In 1954, the Romanian truck manufacturer SR, ( named in honour of the Communist movement, introduced a  truck made in their factory in Brașov. The model, inspired by Russian designs, was available in a range of sizes, with either diesel or petrol engines. The SR 113 Bucegi of 1962 was typical. The truck was popular amongst users in Romania and was also exported by Kașinexport.

As the following decade progressed, and particularly after the 1973 oil crisis, there was a desire for vehicles with greater fuel efficiency. In consequence, in 1975, Diesel Auto Camion (DAC) introduced the 6135. Derived from the Bucegi, the new model replaced the V8 with a lighter and more fuel-efficient 6-cylinder engine, and had slight alterations to the grille. Overall width and height to the top of the cab were both . The  797-05 engine was a Saviem design and longitudinally mounted under the hood. Drive was to the rear wheels through a single plate clutch, five speed ZF manual transmission and two speed spiral bevel gears. The brakes were air-assisted.

The steel cab accommodated three people. The truck was also produced with a tipper as the 6135RK and as a tractor as the 6135RS. A four wheel drive version was also available named the 6135RA and 6135RAN.

Production

Production commenced in 1975. The truck soon became popular, both as a general transport for goods, and in more specialised roles, including as a mobile workshop to support urban tram and trolleybus networks. The truck soon came to dominate the streets of Romania, particularly as a transport for bread and other foods. Improvements were made in 1980, when non-structural steel parts of the design, including the hood, were replaced by plastic, saving  in weight.

By 1983, the plant had been renamed Intreprindea de Autocamione Brasov. Production was to cease with the introduction of the 8135 as a replacement in 1985, but the popularity of the truck meant it was still manufactured, although in smaller quantities, throughout the decade. The truck was exported, increasingly helped by the favourable exchange rate of the Romanian lei, which meant the export price of a 6135N in 1988 was $4890. Exports continued after the Fall of the Berlin Wall, increasingly to Western countries like Germany and the United States, but against greater competition from more advanced products. In 1990, the manufacturer, now known as Roman, continued small scale production of the 6135 without change under the original brand DAC. However, the end was in sight. By 1992, production had ceased.

References

Citations

Bibliography

 
 
 
 
 
 
 

All-wheel-drive vehicles
Rear-wheel-drive vehicles
Trucks
Vehicles introduced in 1975
Vehicles of Romania